The 1972 United States presidential election in California took place on November 7, 1972 as part of the 1972 United States presidential election. State voters chose 45 representatives, or electors, to the Electoral College, who voted for president and vice president.

California voted for the Republican incumbent, Richard Nixon, over the Democratic challenger, South Dakota Senator George McGovern. Nixon took 55.00% of the vote to McGovern's 41.54%, a margin of 13.46%. Although California was Richard Nixon's home state, his performance in the state was somewhat underwhelming, as California's result was about 9% more Democratic than the nation as a whole.

Nixon had previously won California against John F. Kennedy in 1960 and then against Hubert Humphrey in 1968.

This was the first presidential election in which California had the most electoral college votes as a result of the 1970 census, a status it has maintained ever since.

Primaries

Democratic

Republican 
Richard Nixon would easily win the California Republican Primary by a wide margin over his only state challenger.

Results

Results by county

References

1972
California
1972 California elections